Daniel D. Sasnett (born March 20, 1978) is an American professional stock car racing driver. He last competed part-time in the NASCAR Gander Outdoors Truck Series, driving the Nos. 33 and 32 Chevrolet Silverado and Toyota Tundra for Reaume Brothers Racing and the No. 0 Silverado for JJC Racing.

Racing career

NASCAR Gander Outdoors Truck Series
Sasnett made his debut in the NASCAR Gander Outdoors Truck Series in the 2019 TruNorth Global 250 at Martinsville Speedway, driving the No. 33 Chevrolet Silverado for Reaume Brothers Racing. He raced at Gateway finishing 26th.

ARCA Racing Series
Sasnett made his ARCA debut at Daytona in 2018 driving the No. 33 Chevrolet for Win-Tron Racing. Before this, he was an instructor for the Richard Petty Driving Experience at the Daytona International Speedway.

Motorsports career results

NASCAR
(key) (Bold – Pole position awarded by qualifying time. Italics – Pole position earned by points standings or practice time. * – Most laps led.)

Gander Outdoors Truck Series

ARCA Racing Series
(key) (Bold – Pole position awarded by qualifying time. Italics – Pole position earned by points standings or practice time. * – Most laps led.)

 Season still in progress
 Ineligible for series points

References

External links
 

1978 births
Living people
NASCAR drivers
Racing drivers from Florida
ARCA Menards Series drivers